Adam is an 1889 sculpture by Antoine Bourdelle.

Houston
A bronze sculpture is installed at the Lillie and Hugh Roy Cullen Sculpture Garden in Houston, Texas, in the United States.

See also

 1889 in art
 List of public art in Houston
 List of works by Antoine Bourdelle

References

External links
 

1889 establishments in Texas
1889 sculptures
Bronze sculptures in Texas
Cultural depictions of Adam and Eve
Lillie and Hugh Roy Cullen Sculpture Garden
Sculptures by Antoine Bourdelle
Sculptures of men in Texas
Statues in Houston